Charles Comstock may refer to:

 Charles C. Comstock, American businessman and politician from Michigan
 Charles W. Comstock, American attorney and judge